Kansas, in the geographic center of the United States, has a rich history connected with the American Old West and with the American Civil War ("Bleeding Kansas"), including the history of the notorious guerrilla commander William Quantrill. The following is a partial chronological list of major motion pictures set in Kansas.

Three of the listed films have won the Academy Award for Best Picture.

References

Kansas
Mass media in Kansas
 
Articles containing video clips